Brandon Johnson (born March 2, 1985) is an American former professional middle-distance runner, who specialized in the 800 metres and previously the 400 meter hurdles until 2012.

Junior career
At the 2004 World Junior Championships in Athletics Johnson won gold as part of the 4x400 meter relay team and silver in the 400 meter hurdles.

College career
Johnson was runner-up at the 2007 NCAA Men's Division I Outdoor Track and Field Championships for the UCLA Bruins in the 400 meter hurdles.

International career
At the 2013 USA Outdoor Track and Field Championships Johnson finished 3rd in the 800m securing a spot at the 2013 World Championships in Athletics where he was a semi-finalist.

He was a member of the United States' distance medley relay team which set the world record of 9:15.50 at the 2015 IAAF World Relays in Nassau.

Achievements

Personal bests
Outdoor
400 metres – 46.34 (Westwood, CA 2005)
800 metres – 1:43.84 (Madrid 2013)
1000 metres – 2:22.18 (Houston 2016)
1500 metres – 3:45.12 (Walnut, CA 2014)
400 metres hurdles – 48.59 (Sacramento 2005)
Indoor
400 metres – 47.61 (Fayetteville 2006)
800 metres – 1:48.27 (Winston Salem 2015)

References

External links
 
 

1985 births
Living people
American male middle-distance runners
American male hurdlers
UCLA Bruins men's track and field athletes
World Athletics record holders (relay)
21st-century American people
People from Orange, Texas